Ab Dozduiyeh (also Romanized as Āb Dozdūīyeh; also known as Ābdūzak and Āb Dūzīyeh) is a village in Jaydasht Rural District, in the Central District of Firuzabad County, Fars Province, Iran. At the 2006 census, its population was 167, in 36 families.

References 

Populated places in Firuzabad County